California's 66th State Assembly district is one of 80 California State Assembly districts. It is currently represented by Democrat Al Muratsuchi of Rolling Hills Estates.

District profile 
The district encompasses the heart of the South Bay region, including the Beach Cities and the Palos Verdes Peninsula. Located southwest of Downtown Los Angeles, the district is relatively suburban and primarily affluent.

Los Angeles County – 4.8%
 Alondra Park
 Gardena – 74.2%
 Hermosa Beach
 Lomita
 Los Angeles – 1.0%
 Harbor City – partial
 Harbor Gateway – partial
 Manhattan Beach
 Palos Verdes Estates
 Rancho Palos Verdes
 Redondo Beach
 Rolling Hills
 Rolling Hills Estates
 Torrance
 West Carson

Election results from statewide races

List of Assembly Members 
Due to redistricting, the 66th district has been moved around different parts of the state. The current iteration resulted from the 2011 redistricting by the California Citizens Redistricting Commission.

Election results 1992 - present

2020

2018

2016

2014

2012

2010

2008

2006

2004

2002

2000

1998

1996

1994

1992

See also 
 California State Assembly
 California State Assembly districts
 Districts in California

References

External links 
 District map from the California Citizens Redistricting Commission

66
Government of Los Angeles County, California
Hermosa Beach, California
Palos Verdes Peninsula
Lomita, California
Manhattan Beach, California
Redondo Beach, California
South Bay, Los Angeles
Torrance, California